The Pacific Cooperative Poultry Producers Egg-Taking Station, located in Eugene, Oregon, is listed on the National Register of Historic Places.

See also
 National Register of Historic Places listings in Lane County, Oregon

References

1928 establishments in Oregon
Industrial buildings and structures on the National Register of Historic Places in Oregon
Industrial buildings completed in 1928
National Register of Historic Places in Eugene, Oregon